Clegg is an unincorporated community in Wake County, North Carolina, United States on North Carolina Highway 54, north of the highway's intersection with North Carolina Highway 540.

References

Unincorporated communities in North Carolina
Unincorporated communities in Wake County, North Carolina